Samuel Miller (September 16, 1891 – ????) was an American trumpeter. He was the principal trumpet with the New York Symphony from 1918 to 1919, the San Francisco Symphony from 1919-1921, the Cleveland Orchestra for the 1920-1921 season, and the Detroit Symphony for the 1921-1922 season. He played trumpet and cornet with The Goldman Band for several seasons in 1920; from 1927-1929; in 1931 and again in 1934.

Early life
Samuel Miller was born September 16, 1891 in Russia.

References

1891 births
Date of death missing
American classical trumpeters